Patti is a constituency of the Uttar Pradesh Legislative Assembly covering the city of Patti in the Pratapgarh district of Uttar Pradesh, India.

Patti is one of five assembly constituencies in the Pratapgarh Lok Sabha constituency. Since 2008, this assembly constituency is numbered 249 amongst 403 constituencies. Patti has more than 3,50,000 voters.

Election results

2022

2017
Bharatiya Janta Party candidate Rajendra Pratap Singh won in 2017 Uttar Pradesh Legislative Elections defeating Samajwadi Party candidate Ram Singh by a margin of 1,476 votes.

References

External links
 

Assembly constituencies of Uttar Pradesh
Pratapgarh district, Uttar Pradesh